Alwar State was a kingdom from 1770 to 1818 and a princely state under British rule from 1818 to 1947. Initially its capital was Macheri and then the city of Alwar. The nobility of Alwar State belonged to the Naruka branch of the Kachwaha dynasty. The kingdom was established by Naruka chief Rao Raja Pratap Singh in 1770 CE. Alwar State was one of the 19 princely states of former-Rajputana, which existed at the time of Indian Independence. The last reigning ruler, Maharaja Sir Tej Singh Prabhakar Bahadur, signed the accession to the Indian Union on 7 April 1949.

History
The kings of Alwar belonged to Naruka clan. They are direct descendants of eldest son of Raja Udaikarna (1367), Rao Bar Singh, who gave up his right of accession to the throne of Amer. Bar Singh received the estates of Jhak and Mauzabad towns, a few miles south-west of Jaipur. His grandson was Rao Naru Singh who founded the Naruka clan. One of his descendants Rao Kalyan Singh lost his ancestral estate for his loyalty to his chief, Jai Singh and received in lieu of it, Macheri in 1639 which had been taken from Badgujar Rajputs.

After the death of Aurangzeb, internal dissensions encouraged the petty chieftains to acquire power. Maharaja Surajrmal of Bharatpur conquered the Alwar fort and some of the adjacent territory. But his son Jawahar Singh, after being defeated by the Jaipur ruler at the battle of Maonda-Mandoli and lost the territory gained by his father. In 1775 Pratap Singh of Naruka family acquired Alwar fort.

Maharao Raja Pratap Singh (1740-1791) 

Later, Pratap Singh was the son of Muhabbat Singh of Macheri. He was born in 1740. When still young, he was sent to relieve the famous fort of Ranthambor in 1759 which was besieged by the Marathas under the leadership of Gangadhar Tautia. He showed great bravery and ability in the battle that, ensued at Kankod village. The Marathas fled away.

Once an astrologer at the Jaipur court predicted that the Rao would attain kingly dignity. Fearing his rise, court intrigues were hatched against him. A shot was also fired at him in 1765. Sensing a danger to his life, he left Jaipur immediately reached Rajgarh. From Rajgarh, he went to Jawahar Singh of Bharatpur who welcomed him and bestowed on him the jagir of Dehra village.In 1768, Jawahar Singh insulted the Jaipur Chief by marching without intimation of his motive, through his Stale, to visit the holy lake of Pushkar near Ajmer. On his return journey, he was attacked by the Rajputs of the State he had insulted and defeated at Maonda-Mandholi in the Tanwarati hills, 60 miles north of Jaipur. "The victory was, in a great measure, due to the transfer by Pratap Singh of his supporters to the side of his liegelord on the eve of the battle. He was moved to this either by the insult to his country, which a Rajput could ill bear, or by his desire to become reconciled with his own sovereign." As a result of his loyalty, Pratap was restored to his fief of Macheri and was also allowed to build a fort at Rajgarh.

Madho Singh of Jaipur had died only four days after the battle of Maonda-Mandholi and Pratap Singh II, a minor succeeded him under guardianship of the mother of his younger brother. Pratap Singh gained great influence at the court through friends in the Council. At this time Najaf Khan, the imperial commander aided by Marathas, proceeded to expel Jats from Agra and then attacked Bharatpur. Pratap Singh aligned himself with Najaf Khan and aided him in defeating the Jats, "This timely succour and his subsequent aid in defeating the Jats, obtained for him the title of Rao Raja and a Sanad for Machheri, to hold direct of the crown." Pratap Singh found an opportunity of reducing the fortress of Alwar which then belonged to the Jat princes of Bharatpur and seized it. He entered the fort of Alwar in November 1775.

The followers of Pratap Singh began to own him as their feudal lord as soon as the Alwar fort was taken. Some of estates were escheated to the new State. Lands were also snatched from the possessions of Jats. He increased his wealth by relieving a rich man at Thanaghazi of some of his possessions and by plundering Baswa, a town belonging to Jaipur State. This act resulted in a raid by the Jaipur ruler in person, upon Rajgarh fort. The Maharaja failed to take the place and to defeat his former vassal, on account of the alliance he had formed with the Marathas. He died on 26 September 1791.

Maharao Raja Sawai Bakhtawar Singh (1791-1815) 
Pratap Singh left no sons to succeed him. He had adopted a curious method to select his successor. He invited all his relations and nobles with their sons at his palace. Then he called together all the boys whose relationship to himself and ordinary considerations would place them in the list of claimants and asked them to pick up the toys of their choice which were placed in the room. He then chose the one who selected a sword and shield, as the most worthy. This child was Bakhtawar Singh of Thana (near Rajgarh, Alwar), younger son of Dhir Singh.

When Bakhtawar Singh was at Jaipur, the chief of Jaipur seized him and did not release him until he had given up five of fertile districts, Bakhtawar Singh soon recouped himself for his losses by occupying lands of other chiefs and strengthened his position by allying himself with the British Government. To checkmate the menacing power of the Marathas, he coalesced his troops with those of British Commander-in-Chief, Lord Lake in the battle that was fought on 1 November 1803 at Laswari, a small village eight miles south-east of Ramgarh, in the district.

Maharaja Bakhtawar Singh of Alwar concluded a defensive and offensive treaty with the British on 14 November 1803. The treaty also stipulated that the foreign relations of Alwar were to be regulated by the British government but the government was engaged not to "interfere with the country of Maharao Raja". The Bntish demanded no tribute. This victory established British supremacy in Northern India. The Alwar chief was rewarded with the grant of Parganas of Ismailpur and Mandawar together with the taluks of Darbarpura, Ratal (Karnikot), Mandhan, Gilot, Sarai, Bijwar, Nimrana (which was subsequently restored to the raja as a feudatory of Alwar), Dadri, Loharu and Budwana. The vakeel, Ahmad Baksh Khan received as reward the districts of Ferozpur (from British Government) and Loharu (285 sq. miles) from the Alwar ruler under the title of Nawab.

He is said to have become deranged in the evening of his reign and showed his insanity principally by his cruelty to Muslims, The mosques were razed to the ground; the tombs of Ghalib Shahid at Alwar and that of Sayyad Jalaluddin at Bahadurpur were dug out and the dwelling of Kamal Chisti (nephew of Salim Chisti) at Alwar, was destroyed. Observing of namaz and offering the sacrifices were forbidden. Major Powlett states that he gave fakirs the option of their noses cut off or of performing miracles and that on one occasion, he sent a pot full of noses and ears to his old vakeel at Loharu. It is said that the British forces invaded the State on a request from the emperor at Delhi and when the forces reached Bahadurpur, the country was saved from destruction by offering several lakhs of rupees by Nawab Ahmad Baksh Khan. Others contend that the forces were sent not on the request from the emperor to retaliate the harm done to the Muslims at Alwar but because the Rao committed a breach of the treaty with the British by acquiring Dubbi and Sikrai.

The Rao died in 1815. One of his concubines, Musi by name, committed sati. A magnificent chhatri or cenotaph was erected as a memorial at the side of the tank in the rear of the Alwar Palace.

In the treaty with Lord Lake he was styled as Maharaja Sawai Bakhtawar Singh. There does not seem to have been any direct grant by the Moghul or British power of either of the title just mentioned, though the former, no doubt, was assumed as soon as the State became independent and the latter was adopted in imitation of Jaipur or perhaps in direct rivalry with it.

Maharao Raja Sawai Viney Singh (1815-57) 

Bakhtawar Singh had desired to adopt his nephew Viney Singh, son of his brother Salah Singh of Thana, but the Rao died before the formal ceremonies were completed. The court factions conspired against Viney Singh and enthroned Balwant Singh, an illegitimate son of the late ruler. The pretender was only six years old. His most important supporter was the Nawab of Loharu.  After a time, Viney Singh’s party got the upper hand and the imposter was made a prisoner. In 1826, at the advance of the British force the Maharaja yielded to give concession to Balwant Singh. The claimant who resided at Tijara, died in 1845 childless.

Major Powlett assigns Viney Singh a high place and remarks that he was a paragon of a good native chief of the old school, though at times, he was cruel. The Government of the State had previously been carried on without system but with the assistance of some Muslim gentlemen of Delhi whom the Chief took into his service and made Diwans about 1838; great changes were made in the administrative system.

He was a great patron of arts and letters, and attracted painters and skilled artisans from various parts of India to his service.He has left many splendid monuments to his name, such as a grand extensive palace in the city, and a smaller one called the Moti Dungri or Viney Vilas. His greatest work was building a palace near Lake Siliserh, which became a resort and a tourist destination, for his Queen Shila in 1845.

During the last five years of his life he suffered from paralysis. Bedridden as he was during the Mutiny of 1857, he selected the best of his army and despatched a force consisting of about 800 infantry, 400 cavalry and four guns, to the assistance of the beleaguered British garrison at Agra. The cavalry, among whom were all Rajpuls-the remainder principally Mahomedans. The Nimach and Nasirabad brigade of mutineers came upon them at Achnera, on the road between Bharatpur and Agra. Deserted by their leader and the Mahomedan portion of the force, including the artillery the Rajputs suffered a severe defeat. Viney Singh died in August 1857, before the sorrowful news reached him.

Maharao Raja Sawai Sheodan Singh (1857-1874) 
Viney Singh was succeeded by his only surviving son, Sheodan Singh, who was twelve years of age at the time. The actual administration passed on to his Dewan, The Dewan had a domineering influence over the young ruler, so much so that the latter adopted Mohammadan style of dress and speech. On a night of 1858, the Rajputs, under the leadership of Lakhdhir Singh, the Thakur of Bijwad, raised the standard of revolt and raided the dwelling of the Dewan. The Dewan, sensing the danger fled away. When Captain Nixon, Political Agent of Bharatpur was informed of the incident, he proceeded to Alwar. A council of Administration was appointed by Nixon under the presidency of Thakur Lakhdhir Singh. Captain Impey was appointed Political Agent of Ulwur in November 1858. He constituted a new Council consisting of five Thakurs for salvaging the administration, ruined by Dewans. Another council was also constituted to carry on its duties in a most satisfactory manner until the Maharao Raja was invested with power in 1863.

A protracted tussle had been going between the Alwar ruler and the Raja of Nimrana. The former considered the latter as a mere jagirdar of the Alwar State whereas the latter claimed complete independence. The dispute came to an cud in 1868 when the Raja of Nimrana was allowed to enjoy the civil and criminal powers within his estate subject to some rules. He was to pay an annual tribute to the Alwar State, equal to l/8th of his land revenue and Rs. 500/- as Nazarana. Thus, Nimrana was made a feudatory of Alwar.

As soon as the Maharao acquired the reins of his State, he renewed his contacts with the expelled Dewan, who continued to exercise his influence through his agents at Alwar court. The Musalman ministers escheated the jagirs of Charans, Brahamans and Rajputs. This resulted in a general unrest. When the Maharao ignored their grievances,disgruntled Rajputs, assembled at Khohara with their troops and resolved to expel the Muslims from the State. However, Captain James Blaire, the Political Agent for East Rajputana took timely action and assured the restoration of their jagirs. But the Maharao was adamant and refused to buzz an inch. Thereupon the faction resorted to arms and besieged Hamirpur. The Maharao also sent his troops to protect the village but these were routed. Major Cadell, who was Agent at Bharatpur tried to bring about a reconciliation. With permission of the British Government, he interfered in the administration of the State by dismissing the unscrupulous and inefficient officers. The refractory jagirdars who had stopped paying the revenue, were punished. A plot to kill Major Cadell was unearthed timely which had been hatched at the connivance of the Maharao.

The financial bankruptcy of the State was inevitable. The Council was composed of four Naruka Thakurs, and a Brahman. A fixed allowance and an establishment was granted to the Maharao. Reforms in the road system were effected, Post and Telegraph lines were laid and systematic survey of the land was made.

The Maharao, being divested of all powers, led a miserable life, fell ill, and soon passed away.

Maharaj Sawai Mangal Singh (1874-1892) 
The ruler left no heir to the throne and the families of the Barah Kothri were not unanimous in his selection. At last, the Government of India put up the two candidates before the Barah Kothri, Mangal Singh of Thana was supported by a majority and consequently, the Viceroy confirmed him as the ruler of Alwar. He ascended the throne on 14 December 1874. He was fifteen years and a month old at the time.

The young ruler joined the Mayo College, Ajmer on 22 October 1875. On February, 1877, he married the second daughter of Maharaj Prithvisingh, ruler of Kishangarh. His second wife was from Ratlam whom he married in 1878.

He was created an Honorary Lieutenant Colonel in the British army in 1885 and the following year, was enrolled as a Knight Grand Commander of the Most Exalted Order of the Star of India. He received the dignified title of Maharaja as a hereditary distinction in 1889.

He died at the age of 34 years, on 22 May 1892 at Nainital, owing to excess dose of liquor.

Sawai Maharaja Sir Jai Singh (1892-1937) 

Maharaja Mangal Singh was succeeded by his minor son, Jai Singh, He was educated at the Mayo College, Ajmer and was invested with ruling powers on 10 December 1903 by Lord Curzon, Under his reign, the police department of the State was reorganised, He attended the Delhi Darbar held on the occasion of coronation of Emperor Edward VII and met the Emperor the next year, on 15 December 1905 when he visited this country. In 1907-08 the official language was changed from Urdu to Hindi. The British Government conferred the title of K.C.S.I. upon him in 1909.

The Alwar State liberally supported the war effort of the British Government during the World War I. The Mangal Lancers and Jey Paltan fought on various fronts-Suez Canal, Egypt, Sinai, Ghaza and Rapha. The Maharaja was appointed Honorary Lieutenant Colonel in the British army on 1 January 1915 and an Honorary Colonel on 1 January 1921. At the end of the war, the title of G.C.I.E, was conferred on him on 1 January 1919 and that of G.C.S.I., on 3 June 1924. He attended the Imperial Conference held in London in 1923 as a representative of India and was a prominent figure in the Chamber of Princes and at the First Round Table Conference.

He was a fine polo and racquet player, a scholar of Hindu philosophy and an orator of higher order. He was an outstanding personality in many ways and participated in many National and International conferences. He frequently and fearlessly gave vent to his ideas of nationalism. He always spoke eloquently of the fine cultural heritage and greatness of India as a whole. He had equal command over English and Hindi and also knew Sanskrit.

The high British officers in India were already unhappy with him because he would never acknowledge their superiority or submit to them. Bad finances of the State coupled with public agitation and the Neemuchana massacre, gave the British authorities opportunity to interfere in his administration and he was in 1933, ultimately asked to leave the State. He died in Paris on 19 May 1937 leaving no lineal or adopted son.

Maharaja Tej Singh (1937-1947) 
Sawai Maharaja Sir Tej Singh born on 19 March 1911, was installed on the throne on 22 July 1937.

Education made strides during his reign. A number of schools were opened and upgraded. Various communities also started hostels with State aid. Sanskrit College was also opened. The area where Hope Circus now stands was made into a beautiful marketing centre. The closing period of the Maharaja’s rule was marred by communal frenzy in which several hundred people died and many more, migrated from the State. After attainment of independence, the ruler signed the instrument of accession which made the State a component part of the United States of Matsya.

Following the Partition of India in 1947, Alwar acceded unto the dominion of India with the state's forces participating in and encouraging the killings and expulsion of its Muslim population. On 18 March 1948, the state merged with three neighbouring princely states (Bharatpur, Dholpur and Karauli) to form the Matsya Union. This union in turn merged unto the Union of India. On 15 May 1949, it was united with certain other princely states and the territory of Ajmer to form the present-day Indian state of Rajasthan.

Rulers of Alwar state
 Partap Singh (1770-1791) Raja of Alwar
 Bakhtawar Singh Prabhakar (reign: 1791–1815), Raja of Alwar
 Viney Singh Prabhakar (reign: 1815–1857), Raja of Alwar
 Sheodan Singh Prabhakar (reign: 1857–1874), Raja of Alwar
 Sir Mangal Singh Prabhakar (reign: 1874–1892), Maharaja of Alwar
 Honorary Colonel Sir Jai Singh Prabhakar (reign: 1892–1937), Maharaja of Alwar
 Colonel Sir Tej Singh Prabhakar (reign: 1937-1947), the reigning Maharaja of Alwar; Singh remained the ruler or Maharaja up until his death in New Delhi in February 2009
 Jitendra Singh, the current Maharaja of Alwar (since February 2009)

Relics
The Alwar City Palace, or Vinay Vilas, built in 1793 by Raja Bakhtawar Singh,
is now a district administrative office.

Revenue
The revenue of the state in 1901 was Rs.3,200,000.

See also
 Mughal Empire
 Maratha Empire
 Rajputana
 Alwar
 Alwar fort

References

External links

Indian Durbar (1938) - filmed in Alwar
Alwar History & Genealogy

Alwar district
Princely states of Rajasthan
1770 establishments in India
1949 disestablishments in India
Rajputs